In India, the Department of General Education is the Government of Kerala's body for school education. Founded in 1995, The department administers school education from pre-primary level to the higher secondary level and teacher training. the department is in charge of conducting Secondary School Leaving Certificate examinations in Kerala State. Secondary School Leaving Certificate examinations are usually held in March and results are announced on April or May.

Organisation

Department of General Education 
Principal Secretary to the Government is the administrative head of the department and is the principal adviser to the education minister on all matters of policy and administration within the General Education department. It's the secretariat department responsible for general education.

Directorate of General Education 
The Director of General Education (formerly, the Director of Public Instruction) is the Head of the Department. The Director of General Education is also the Commissioner for Government Examinations in the state.  In examination-related activities, he is assisted by the Joint Commissioner, the Secretary, and other staff from the Pareekshabhaven (Office of the Commissioner for Government Examinations).

The Directorate of General Education is made up of the Joint Directors, Regional Deputy Directors, Deputy Directors, and Assistant Directors of Higher Secondary and Vocational Higher Secondary. The department has several Joint Directors who assist the Director in the management and supervision of the department. Each Joint Director is responsible for a specific area, such as primary education, secondary education, or higher secondary education.

The Deputy Directors are responsible for the day-to-day management of the department. They are responsible for implementing policies and programs related to education at the district level.

The Assistant Directors are responsible for the implementation of policies and programs related to education at the school level. They provide technical support to the headmasters and teachers of government schools. 

District offices, supervised by Deputy Directors of Education, are located in each of the 14 revenue districts for administrative convenience and to increase the effectiveness of school instruction. There are educational districts and educational sub-districts inside each revenue district. In the State, there are 163 educational sub-district offices led by Assistant Educational Officers (AEO) for the administration of all primary schools within the sub-district and 41 educational district offices headed by District Educational Officers (DEO) for the administration of high schools (HS), training schools, and other special types of schools. Higher secondary (HSS) and vocational higher secondary (VHSE) schools are under the administrative control of joint directors, regional deputy directors, deputy directors, and assistant directors.

Organizational Structure 

 Director of General Education (Head of Department)
 Additional Director of General Education
 Joint Director of General Education
 Regional Deputy Director (Higher Secondary Education)
 Assistant Director (Vocational Higher Secondary Education)
 Deputy Director of Education (DDE)
 District Educational Officer (DEO)
 Assistant Educational Officer (AEO)
 Principal/Head Master of schools

Bodies/Agencies
Kerala Board of Public Examination
State Council of Educational Research and Training, Kerala
Kerala Education Mission
KITE Kerala
State Council for Open and Lifelong Education (SCOLE, Kerala)
Kerala State Literacy Mission Authority

References

External links 
 The official website of General Education Department, Government of Kerala

Education in Kerala
Government departments of Kerala
Kerala
Educational institutions established in 1995
1995 establishments in Kerala